Gymnodactylus vanzolinii is a species of lizard in the family Phyllodactylidae. The species is native to Brazil.

Etymology
The specific name, vanzolinii, is in honor of Brazilian herpetologist and samba composer Paulo Vanzolini.

Geographic range
G. vanzolinii is endemic to the Brazilian state of Bahia.

Reproduction
The mode of reproduction of G. vanzolinii is unknown.

References

Further reading
Cassimiro J, Rodrigues MT (2009). "A new species of lizard genus Gymnodactylus Spix, 1825 (Squamata: Gekkota: Phyllodactylidae) from Serra do Sincorá, northeastern Brazil, and the status of G. carvalhoi Vanzolini, 2005". Zootaxa 2008: 38–52. (Gymnodactylus vanzolinii, new species). (in English, with an abstract in Portuguese).

Gymnodactylus
Endemic fauna of Brazil
Reptiles of Brazil
Reptiles described in 2009